Christopher R. Swanson is an American law enforcement officer from the state of Michigan. Swanson is the Sheriff of Genesee County, which contains the city of Flint. In this role, Swanson leads 269 officers, the tenth largest police force in Michigan.

Background 

Swanson was born in Medina, Ohio, and is an alumnus of the University of Michigan, where he received both his bachelor's degree and master's degree.

In addition to being a law enforcement officer, Swanson is also a licensed paramedic; the Office of Genesee County Sheriff is one of the only agencies in the State of Michigan with dual police officer/paramedics assigned to road patrol.

Swanson is a three-time author, including a recent children's book that highlights memories from his own childhood. In addition, Swanson has authored Tinman to Ironman  and Blood, Guts, and Things That Drive You Nuts. 

In 2014, while serving as the Genesee County Undersheriff Swanson and fellow officers delivered water to the citizens of Flint during the Flint water crisis.

On January 5, 2020, the longtime Sheriff of Genesee County, Robert J. Pickell, retired. Swanson, Undersheriff at the time, was appointed Sheriff. Swanson was sworn in as sheriff on December 23, 2019.

George Floyd Protests 

On May 30, 2020, during the George Floyd protests in Flint, Swanson received national attention when he removed his riot gear and marched with the protesters.

Genesee Human Oppression Strike Team (GHOST) 

Swanson founded the Genesee Human Oppression Strike Team (GHOST) in 2018, which is a specialized unit of officers from the Office of Genesee County Sheriff who combat crimes of human trafficking and drug offenses throughout southeast Michigan. Since inception in 2018, GHOST has arrested more than 70 individuals for crimes of trafficking, criminal sexual conduct, drugs offenses and other related offenses.

Inmate Growth Naturally and Intentionally Through Education (IGNITE) 

Upon taking office, Swanson instituted IGNITE in the Genesee County Jail, a program which facilitates educational programs to Genesee County Jail inmates.  In 2021, Swanson was featured in the USA Today for his opinion piece on criminal justice reform and IGNITE.

Elder Abuse Task Force 

Swanson also oversees the Elder Abuse Task Force, which was started by his predecessor Sheriff Robert J. Pickell in 2008.

2020 Election 

Swanson won election to a full term as sheriff.  He defeated former Flint Police Chief Phil Hart in the Democratic primary in August, and defeated the Republican candidate, U.S. Army veteran Stephen Sanford, in the general election, receiving 65% of the vote.

TEDx Detroit 

In November 2021 Swanson delivered an eight minute speech at the 2021 TEDx Detroit Event in Detroit, MI.

References 

1972 births
People from Medina, Ohio
People from Flint, Michigan
University of Michigan alumni
George Floyd protests in the United States
Michigan Democrats
Michigan sheriffs

Living people